The Yurok Indian Reservation is a Native American reservation for the Yurok people located in parts of Del Norte and Humboldt counties, California, on a  stretch of the Klamath River. It is one of a very few tribes who have never been removed from their ancestral lands in California.

With 6,311 enrolled members, the Yurok Tribe is California's largest Native American Tribe. The  reservation is serviced by California Route 169 from the south, which dead ends within the reservation. It is bordered by the Hoopa Indian Reservation to the south, adjacent to Redwood National Park to the west and completely surrounds the Resighini Rancheria. The 2000 census reported a resident population of 1,103 persons on reservation territory, mostly in the community of Klamath, at the reservation's north end. As of the 2010 Census the population was 1,238.

See also
 Yurok people
 Yurok language
 List of Indian reservations in the United States

References

External links
 Yurok Tribe of the Yurok Reservation, official site
 Yurok Reservation, California United States Census Bureau

Yurok
American Indian reservations in California
Federally recognized tribes in the United States
Native American tribes in California
Native Americans in Humboldt County, California
Native Americans in Del Norte County, California
Klamath River